
Gmina Włoszczowa is an urban-rural gmina (administrative district) in Włoszczowa County, Świętokrzyskie Voivodeship, in south-central Poland.

Villages
Apart from the town of Włoszczowa, Gmina Włoszczowa contains the villages and settlements of Bebelno-Kolonia, Bebelno-Wieś, Boczkowice, Czarnca, Dąbie, Danków Duży, Danków Mały, Gościencin, Jamskie, Jeżowice, Kąty, Konieczno, Kurzelów, Kuzki, Łachów, Ludwinów, Międzylesie, Motyczno, Nieznanowice, Ogarka, Podłazie, Przygradów, Rogienice, Rząbiec, Silpia Duża, Silpia Mała, Wola Wiśniowa and Wymysłów.

Neighbouring gminas
Gmina Włoszczowa is bordered by the gminas of Kluczewsko, Koniecpol, Krasocin, Małogoszcz, Oksa, Radków, Secemin and Żytno.

References
Polish official population figures 2006

Wloszczowa
Włoszczowa County